The MGM-140 Army Tactical Missile System (ATACMS) is a surface-to-surface missile manufactured by the U.S. defense company Lockheed Martin. The ATACMS can be fired from the tracked M270 Multiple Launch Rocket System (MLRS), and the wheeled M142 High Mobility Artillery Rocket System (HIMARS). 

An ATACMS launch container has a lid patterned with six circles like a standard MLRS rocket lid, but contains only one missile – the identical pattern makes it more challenging for enemy intelligence to single it out as a high-value target.

History
The concept of a conventional tactical ballistic missile was made possible by the doctrinal shift of the late Cold War, which rejected the indispensability of an early nuclear strike on the Warsaw Pact forces in the event the Cold War went hot. The AirLand Battle and  doctrines, which emerged in the late 1970s and early 1980s, necessitated a conventional-armed, hence much more accurate, missile to strike enemy reserves, so the US Army Missile Command sponsored the Simplified Inertial Guidance Demonstrator (SIG-D) program. 

Within this program, Ling-Temco-Vought developed a solid-fuel analog of the MGM-52 Lance missile, designated T-22, with a new RLG-based inertial guidance package which demonstrated unprecedented accuracy. In 1978, DARPA started the Assault Breaker technology demonstration program to attack armor formations with many mobile hard targets at standoff ranges. It utilized the T-22 missile and the Patriot-based Martin Marietta T-16 missile with cluster warheads.

Development of the missile now known as ATACMS started in 1980, when the U.S. Air Force decided to replace the Lance with a similar nuclear, but also chemical or biological, tipped solid-fuel missile dubbed the Corps Support Weapon System (CSWS). Concerned that two branches were developing too many similar missiles with different warheads, the Department of Defense merged the program with U.S. Army's Assault Breaker in 1981, and with USAF's Conventional Standoff Weapon (CSW) in 1982–1983. 

The new missile system, designated Joint Tactical Missile System (JTACMS), soon encountered USAF resistance to the idea of an air-launched ballistic missile. As a result, in 1984 the Air Force ended its participation in the non-cruise missile portion of the program, leading to the missile being re-designated as the Army Tactical Missile System (ATACMS).

In March 1986, Ling-Temco-Vought won the contract for the missile design. The system was assigned the MGM-140 designation. The first test launch came two years later, thanks to earlier experience of the company with previous programs.

The first use of the ATACMS in combat was during Operation Desert Storm in 1991, where 32 of the missiles were fired from the M270 MLRS. During Operation Iraqi Freedom in 2003, more than 450 missiles were fired. As of early 2015, over 560 ATACMS missiles had been fired in combat.

In 2007, the U.S. Army terminated the ATACMS program due to cost, ending the ability to replenish stocks. To sustain the remaining inventory, the ATACMS Service Life Extension Program (SLEP) was launched, which refurbishes or replaces propulsion and navigation systems, replaces cluster munition warheads with the unitary blast fragmentation warhead, and adds a proximity fuze option to obtain area effects. Deliveries were projected to start in 2018. The ATACMS SLEP is a bridging initiative to provide time to complete analysis and development of a successor capability to the aging ATACMS stockpile, which could be ready around 2022.

In January 2015, Lockheed Martin received a contract to develop and test new hardware for Block I ATACMS missiles to eliminate the risk of unexploded ordnance by 2016. The first modernized Tactical Missile System (TACMS) was delivered in September 2016 with updated guidance electronics and added capability to defeat area targets using a unitary warhead, without leaving behind unexploded ordnance. Lockheed was awarded a production contract for launch assemblies as part of the SLEP in August 2017. In 2021, Lockheed Martin was contracted to upgrade existing M39 munitions to the M57 variant with a WDU-18/B warhead from the Harpoon missile by 2024.

A plan announced in October 2016 to add an existing seeker to enable the ATACMS to strike moving targets on land and at sea was terminated in December 2020 to pursue other missile efforts.

Variants

 M39 (ATACMS Block I) missile with inertial guidance. It carries 950 M74 Anti-personnel and Anti‑materiel (APAM) bomblets. Range: . 1,650 M39 were produced between 1990 and 1997, when production ceased in favor of the M39A1. During Desert Storm 32 M39 were fired at Iraqi targets and during Operation Iraqi Freedom a further 379 were fired. The remaining M39 missiles are being updated to M57E1 missiles. This is the only variant that can be fired by all M270 and M142 launcher variants.
 M39A1 (ATACMS Block IA) missile with GPS-aided guidance. It carries 300 M74 Anti-personnel and Anti‑materiel (APAM) bomblets. Range: . 610 M39A1 were produced between 1997 and 2003. During Operation Iraqi Freedom 74 M39A1 were fired at Iraqi targets. The remaining M39A1 missiles are being updated to M57E1 missiles. The M39A1 and all subsequently introduced ATACMS missiles can only be used with the M270A1 (or variants thereof) and the M142.
 M48 (ATACMS Quick Reaction Unitary [QRU]) missile with GPS-aided guidance. It carries the  WDU-18/B penetrating high explosive blast fragmentation warhead of the US Navy's Harpoon anti-ship missile, which was redesignated as WAU-23/B warhead section when used in ATACMS. Range: . 176 M48 were produced between 2001 and 2004, when production ceased in favor of the M57. During Operation Iraqi Freedom 16 M48 were fired at Iraqi targets and a further 42 were fired during Operation Enduring Freedom. The remaining M48 missiles are in the US Army and US Marine Corps' arsenal.
 M57 (ATACMS TACMS 2000) missile with GPS-aided guidance. It carries the same WAU-23/B warhead section as the M48. Range: . 513 M57 were produced between 2004 and 2013.  Accuracy is  CEP (Circular Error Probability).
 M57E1 (ATACMS Modification [MOD]) missile with GPS-aided guidance. The M57E1 is the designation for upgraded M39 and M39A1 with re-grained motor, updated navigation and guidance software and hardware, and a WAU-23/B warhead section instead of the M74 APAM bomblets. This variant includes a proximity sensor for airburst detonation. Production commenced in 2017 with an initial order for 220 upgraded M57E1s.

Future

Speculated Ukrainian use
There was speculation in August 2022 that ATACMS, among a number of possibilities, was used by Ukraine for attacks on Crimean airbases that month. On 24 August, Undersecretary of Defense For Policy, Colin Kahl said: "It's our assessment that they don't currently require ATACMS to service targets that are directly relevant to the current fight. You know, we'll obviously continue to have conversations with the Ukrainians about their needs, but it's our judgment at the moment that we should be focusing on GMLRS, not ATACMS." In February Laura Cooper, the Pentagon's top official for Russia and Ukraine, said ATACMS won't be sent, due to the US having too few of them.

Another system suggested for Ukrainian use is the SAAB-Boeing GLSDB. Each would cost $40,000 USD.
 The price per unit for ATACMS is estimated to be well over $1M.

Precision Strike Missile

In March 2016, Lockheed Martin, Boeing, and Raytheon announced they would offer a missile to meet the U.S. Army's Long Range Precision Fires (LRPF) requirement to replace the ATACMS.

Lockheed and Raytheon were to test-fire their submissions for the renamed Precision Strike Missile (PrSM) program in 2019, with the selected weapon planned to achieve Initial Operational Capability in 2023. The initial PrSM will only be able to hit stationary targets on land, but later versions will track moving targets on land and sea. With the United States withdrawal from the Intermediate-Range Nuclear Forces Treaty in August 2019, it was announced that the range of the PrSM would be increased beyond the '499 km' limitation previously placed upon it by the treaty.

In June 2020, the Army had begun testing a new multi-mode seeker — an upgrade for the Precision Strike Missile. The missile will enter service in 2023. The upgraded seeker is expected to be part of a major program improvement planned for 2025. In July 2021, the U.S. announced that Australia had become a partner in the PrSM Program with the Australian Army, signing a memorandum of understanding for Increment 2 of the program with the US Army's Defense Exports and Cooperation agency, and contributed . The United Kingdom announced its intentions to field the PrSM starting in 2024 as part of an upgrade to the British Army’s M270 MLRS.

Operators

Current operators
 : The Royal Bahraini Army purchased 30 M39-series ATACMS in 2000 and 110 M57 ATACMS in 2018.
 : The Hellenic Army operates the 165 km variant.
 : In 2002, the South Korean Army purchased 111 ATACMS Block I and 110 ATACMS Block IA missiles, which were deployed in 2004. An affiliated company of the Hanwha Group of Korea produces munitions for the missile systems under license from Lockheed Martin.
 : The Romanian Land Forces purchased 54 M57 ATACMS, which were all delivered by June 2022.
 : The Polish Land Forces purchased 30 M57 ATACMS, which were all delivered by June 2022. Another 45 M57 ATACMS were ordered in February 2023.
 : The Turkish Army uses the ATACMS Block IA.
 : The Qatari Emiri Land Force acquired 60 M57 ATACMS in 2012.
 : The United Arab Emirates Army acquired 100 M57 ATACMS in 2014.
 : The United States Army and United States Marine Corps are both ATACMS operators

Future operators
 : Ordered 20 M142 HIMARS launchers for the Australian Army with 10 M57 ATACMS unitary rockets and other MLRS munitions in an AU $545m (US$385m) contract.
 : A request to buy up to 18 M57 was approved in July 2022.
 : A request to buy 18 M57 ATACMS missile pods was approved in November 2022.
 : A request to buy 80 M57 ATACMS pods was approved in February 2023.
 : In October 2020, the U.S. State Department approved the sale of 64 M57 ATACMS to Taiwan.

Potential operators
 : As of July 2022, the U.S. and Ukrainian governments are discussing the possibility of an ATACMS acquisition.

Canceled orders
 : A Finnish contract for 70 missiles was canceled due to high prices in March 2014.

See also
 United States Army Aviation and Missile Command

Comparable missiles
 OTR-21 Tochka
 9K720 Iskander
 KN-24
 P-12
 Prahaar (missile)
 LORA (missile)
 Bora (missile)
 Fateh-313
 KTSSM
 Hrim-2

References

External links

 ATACMS, Lockheed Martin
 Army Tactical Missile System Block IA Unitary Lockheed Martin. Retrieved 6 October 2011.
 
 Precision Guided Missiles and Rockets Program Review U.S. Defense Technical Information Center (14 April 2008).
 ATACMS / ATACMS Block IA Unitary Deagel.com. Retrieved 6 October 2011.
 M39 ATMS GlobalSecurity.org. Retrieved 6 October 2011.
 M39 Army Tactical Missile System (Army TACMS) Federation of American Scientists | FAS.org. Retrieved 6 October 2011.

MGM-140
Military equipment introduced in the 1990s
Cluster munition